Lochmaeocles pseudovestitus is a species of beetle in the family Cerambycidae. It was described by Chemsak and Linsley in 1988. It is known from Mexico.

References

pseudovestitus
Beetles described in 1988